Adiestramima is a genus of cave or camel crickets in the subfamily Aemodogryllinae and tribe Diestramimini.  Originating in Asia, species have been found in the Indo-China region, mostly Vietnam.

Species
The Orthoptera Species File lists:
subgenus Adiestramima Gorochov, 1998
Adiestramima bicolor (Gorochov, 2002
Adiestramima citrea (Gorochov, 1992
Adiestramima multa (Gorochov, 1994) - type species (as Diestramima multa Gorochov)
Adiestramima originalis Gorochov & Storozhenko, 2019
Adiestramima proxima (Gorochov, 1994)
subgenus Hamatotettix Gorochov & Storozhenko, 2019
Adiestramima adunca Gorochov & Storozhenko, 2015
Adiestramima bella Gorochov & Storozhenko, 2015
Adiestramima elongata Gorochov & Storozhenko, 2015
subgenus Ulterotettix Gorochov & Storozhenko, 2019
Adiestramima modesta (Gorochov, 1992)
Adiestramima perfecta Gorochov, 2002

References

External links

Ensifera genera
Rhaphidophoridae
Orthoptera of Indo-China
Orthoptera of Vietnam